The Joint Committee on the Draft Parliamentary Buildings Bill is a joint select committee of the House of Commons and House of Lords in the Parliament of the United Kingdom. The Committee was established in 2018 with a remit to consider the Draft Registration of Overseas Entities Bill. They were due to report on 10 May 2019.

Membership
As of 19 March 2019, the members of the committee are as follows:

See also
 Joint Committee of the Parliament of the United Kingdom
 Parliamentary Committees of the United Kingdom

References

External links
 Joint Committee on the Draft Registration of Overseas Entities Bill UK Parliament

Overseas
Select Committees of the British House of Commons
1894 establishments in the United Kingdom